is a Japanese international rugby union player who plays as a loose forward.

Club career

After graduating from university, Matsuhashi signed for the Ricoh Black Rams and debuted for them at the beginning of the  2016-17 Top League season.

International

After 8 tries in his first 9 Top League appearances, Matsuhashi received his first call-up to Japan's senior squad ahead of the 2016 end-of-year rugby union internationals.

References

1993 births
Living people
Japanese rugby union players
Japan international rugby union players
Rugby union number eights
Black Rams Tokyo players
Meiji University alumni
Sportspeople from Nagano Prefecture
Sunwolves players
Rugby union flankers